North Salem is the name of several communities in the United States:

North Salem, Indiana
North Salem, Missouri
North Salem, New Hampshire
North Salem, New York
North Salem, Ohio